Goven (Gallo: Govaen) is a commune in the Ille-et-Vilaine department in Brittany in northwestern France.

Geography
The Meu river flows into the Vilaine in the commune.

Population
Inhabitants of Goven are called Govenais in French.

See also
Communes of the Ille-et-Vilaine department

References

External links

Official website 

Mayors of Ille-et-Vilaine Association  

Communes of Ille-et-Vilaine